Pseudocheylidae is a family of mites in the order Trombidiformes. There are at least two genera in Pseudocheylidae.

Genera
These two genera belong to the family Pseudocheylidae:
 Anoplocheylus Berlese, 1910
 Pseudocheylus Berlese, 1888

References

Further reading

 
 
 

Trombidiformes
Acari families